Heiner Thade (born 15 September 1942) is a German modern pentathlete. He competed for West Germany at the 1968 and 1972 Summer Olympics.

References

1942 births
Living people
German male modern pentathletes
Olympic modern pentathletes of West Germany
Modern pentathletes at the 1968 Summer Olympics
Modern pentathletes at the 1972 Summer Olympics
People from Lüdinghausen
Sportspeople from Münster (region)